Throughout the history of Major League Baseball, numerous franchises have moved or become defunct. Many of these franchises played in the National League (NL) and the American League (AL), the two existing major leagues, but other franchises played in one of the eleven major leagues that ultimately went defunct. The classification of the major leagues is based on Major League Baseball's recognition of historical leagues.

Major league baseball emerged in the 1870s, and four major leagues, including the NL, played at least one season of baseball in the nineteenth century. During this period, dozens of franchises were founded, but most went defunct, leaving just twelve NL franchises by the 1892 season. After four of the twelve NL franchises went defunct following the 1899 season, the American League emerged in 1901 with several newly founded franchises. The Federal League (FL) challenged the primacy of the American League and the National League for two seasons, but the FL and all of its franchises went defunct after the 1915 season. Numerous Negro leagues operated during the first half of the twentieth century; seven leagues that operated from 1920 to 1948 were later recognized as major leagues by Major League Baseball.
 
Outside of the Negro leagues, no major league franchises relocated for several years after 1915, until the Boston Braves moved to Milwaukee following the 1952 season. Several teams relocated over the next twenty years, often moving to the Western or Southern United States. After a period of over thirty years with no relocation, the Montreal Expos became the Washington Nationals in 2005. However, the Toronto Blue Jays were forced to relocate to Buffalo during the 2020 and 2021 seasons due to the COVID-19 pandemic affecting Canada which closed the border to non-essential travel.

List of defunct and relocated major league franchises since 1892

National, American, and Federal League franchises

These franchises played in the National League, the American League, or the Federal League after the 1891 season and either went defunct or relocated. Some franchises appear more than once in the table; for example, the Braves franchise appears twice because they moved to Milwaukee in 1952 and to Atlanta in 1965.

Negro major league franchises

In 2020, Major League Baseball extended major league recognition to seven Negro leagues:

 Negro National League (NNL I), 1920–1931
 Eastern Colored League (ECL), 1923–1928
 American Negro League (ANL), 1929
 East–West League (EWL), 1932
 Negro Southern League (NSL), 1932
 Negro National League (NNL II), 1933–1948
 Negro American League (NAL), 1937–1948

The listed years in the table below indicate the first and last years that the franchise played in a major league as recognized by Major League Baseball; many franchises existed before or after playing in a major league. Franchises that played only as associate clubs of a major league are not included. From 1924 to 1927, and from 1942 to 1948, the top Negro leagues crowned a champion through the Negro World Series.

List of major league franchises that went defunct prior to 1892

The franchises in the following list went defunct before the 1892 season, and played in the National League, the American Association (AA), the Players' League (PL), the Union Association (UA), or some combination of the four leagues. The NL has played continuously since 1876, the AA existed from 1882 to 1891, the UA existed for one season in 1884, and the PL operated for one season in 1890. Note that there have been many cases of multiple distinct franchises sharing the same name.

In 1968–1969, the Special Records Committee, which was established by Major League Baseball, defined the major leagues as consisting of the NA, NL, AA, PL, UA, American League, and Federal League.  The Special Records Committee excluded the National Association (NA), which operated from 1871 to 1875, as a major league. Some baseball writers have nonetheless argued that the NA should be considered the first major league,  but NA franchises are not included below unless they later played in the National League.

†Indicates a franchise that played in the National Association prior to joining the National League

Timelines

Franchise and league timeline
This timeline includes all franchises (including non-defunct franchises) that played in the AL or NL after 1891; it also shows the eleven historical leagues during the period in which each is considered a major league by Major League Baseball. Active franchises that did not change cities are listed by their current names, even if they were renamed at some point. Franchise moves are marked in black.

Pre-1900 city timeline
This timeline shows the history of major league franchises (including non-defunct franchises) before 1900. Multiple bars for a city indicates that the city hosted multiple major league franchises at the same time; for example, Philadelphia at times hosted two or three franchises concurrently. Gaps in the bars indicate a change in franchises; for example, there were three franchises known as the Kansas City Cowboys. Franchise moves are not tracked by this timeline.

See also
American League franchises
List of defunct professional baseball leagues
National League franchises
National Association franchises

Notes

References

Major League Baseball
Major League Baseball